Brandon Lee Jean-Marie Potmis (born 6 November 1998) is a Sint Maartener international footballer who plays as a midfielder for Veendam FC and the Sint Maarten national football team.

International career
Potmis represented the Sint Maarten under-15 side at the 2013 CONCACAF Under-15 Championship.

He made his first senior appearance for Sint Maarten in a 2–0 friendly win over Anguilla, and his second in a 0–5 defeat by Grenada.

Career statistics

International

References

External links
 CaribbeanFootballDatabase Profile

1998 births
Living people
Dutch Antillean footballers
Sint Maarten footballers
Sint Maarten international footballers
Association football midfielders
Sint Maarten youth international footballers